The Mardi Gras Film Festival is an Australian LGBTQ+ film festival held in Sydney, New South Wales annually as part of the Sydney Gay and Lesbian Mardi Gras celebrations. It is organised by Queer Screen Limited, a non-profit organization,  and is one of the world's largest platforms for queer cinema.

History
Australia had the world's first gay film festival, entitled A Festival of Gay Films at the Sydney Filmmakers Co-op in June 1976, part of a larger commemoration of the Stonewall Riots in New York City of 1969.

Inaugurated in 1978 as the Gay and Lesbian film festival by the Australian Film Institute, the film festival joined the Mardi Gras in 1986 to present an annual Sydney Gay Film Week in conjunction with the parade. Queer Screen took control of the festival in 1993. In addition to the Mardi Gras Film Festival, Queer Screen organises the Queer Screen Film Fest, My Queer Career and queerDOC as part of its aim to celebrate and promote Australian and international queer screen culture in all its diversity and richness. It 2021 it moved to hybrid online and in person festival, to adapt to a Covid landscape.

See also

 Sydney Gay and Lesbian Mardi Gras

References

External links
Queer Screen's official website

Film festivals in Sydney
LGBT culture in Sydney
LGBT film festivals in Australia